Pulchowk Campus (Nepali: पुल्चोक क्याम्पस), commonly known as Pulchowk Engineering Campus, is one of the five constituent campuses of the Tribhuvan University, Institute of Engineering in Nepal, and is one of the best engineering colleges in Asia. Other four constituent campuses are Thapathali Campus, Paschimanchal Campus, Purwanchal Campus, and Chitwan Engineering Campus. This is the central campus of Institute of Engineering (IOE), situated in Lalitpur metropolitan city. The campus offers bachelor's degree, master's degree and doctoral degree programs.

Every year, IOE conducts an entrance examination for the Bachelor of Technology (B.Tech.)/Bachelor in Architecture (B.Arch.) degrees. Students from all over Nepal who wish to study engineering/architecture appear for this exam and only the students on merit basis get the chance to study at the Pulchowk Campus. The campus only takes 624 students from about 15,000 candidates, which roughly estimates the acceptance rate to be 3.8%.

Location 
Pulchowk Campus is located in Kathmandu Valley extending from Chakupat area to the Krishna Galli road of Lalitpur. Institute of Engineering (IOE), Pulchowk Campus occupies about 480 ropanis or 60 acres of land.

History 
History of engineering education in Nepal can be traced since 1942 when Technical Training School was established. Engineering section of the school offered only trades and civil sub-overseers programs. In 1959, Nepal Engineering Institute, with the assistance of the government of India, started offering civil overseer courses leading to Diploma in Civil Engineering. The Technical Training Institute established in 1965, with the assistance from the Government of Federal Republic of Germany, offered technician courses in General courses in General Mechanics, Auto Mechanics, Electrical Engineering and Mechanical Drafting.

In 1972, the Nepal Engineering Institute at Pulchowk and the Technical Training Institute at Thapathali were brought together under the umbrella of the Tribhuvan University to constitute the Institute of Engineering and the Nepal Engineering Institute and the Technical Training Institute were renamed as Pulchowk Campus and Thapathali Campus respectively.

Since then, the Institute of Engineering has expanded considerably. The technician programs in Electrical, Electronics, Refrigeration/Air-conditioning Engineering were started in the Pulchowk Campus, with assistance from UNDP/ILO. The Architecture Technician program was started by the IOE in its own effort. With the assistance of the World Bank and the UK, the technician level courses were strengthened and bachelor's degree level course in Civil Engineering was started. Similarly, with the assistance of the World Bank, the Swiss Government, and the Canadian Government, Bachelor's degree level courses in Electronics, Electrical, Mechanical engineering, and Architecture were started in the Pulchowk Campus. From academic year 1998/99 IOE started bachelor's degree program in Computer Engineering. In 1996 Pulchowk Campus, with support from the Norwegian Government, started M.Sc. courses in Urban Planning, Structural Engineering, Environmental Engineering, and Water Resources Engineering Pulchowk Campus has also started M.Sc. courses in Renewable energy and Geothermal Engineering, Information and communication and Power systems Engineering effective from December 2001.

The diploma level programs at the Pulchowk Campus have been transferred to other three IOE campuses.

Admission

Entrance examinations 
Entrance examinations are conducted for B.E./B.Arch by Tribhuvan University, Institute of Engineering yearly for freshmen, undergraduate and postgraduate intake. The entrance exam for the undergraduate intake is one of the most competitive in the country; more than 15,000 students from all over Nepal compete for admission. Getting into Pulchowk Engineering college is the toughest, as the higher ranked students are more likely to choose it. It only takes 624 students, from about 15,000 candidates, which roughly estimates the acceptance rate to be 3.8%. Especially to get into computer and civil engineering is the toughest. Students with rank under 220 can choose computer engineering and about 400 can choose civil engineering. The lower ranked students in the pool are likely to choose other affiliated colleges or universities.

The enrollment in engineering/architecture courses in Pulchowk Campus is merit-based.

Undergraduate programs 
The undergraduate programs offered in Pulchowk Campus are:

 Bachelor of Civil Engineering 
 Bachelor of Computer Engineering
 Bachelor of Mechanical Engineering
 Bachelor of Aerospace Engineering 
 Bachelor of Electronics, Communication and Information Engineering
 Bachelor of Electrical Engineering
 Bachelor of Chemical Engineering
 Bachelor of Architecture

Bachelor of Civil Engineering (BCE) (192 Seats) 
The Civil Department is the oldest department at Pulchowk Campus, and is the largest department by number of students and faculty members. The labs have been used to test civil engineering materials of projects and companies in Nepal. Civil Engineering is a four-year, eight semester program.

Bachelor of Computer Engineering (BCT) (96 Seats) 
Computer Engineering is a four-year, eight-semester program. Computer Engineers design and develop the application of computer systems. Majority of computers are used as components within other systems such as audio-visual players, the engine management systems, aircraft navigation systems, and automatic control systems. This program is intended to produce skilled, qualified human resource that works for software development, network design and implementation, hardware and software troubleshooting, network security policies, etc.

The Department of Electronics and Communication Engineering offers Master's degree courses in Information and Communications Engineering as well as Computer Systems and Knowledge Engineering. The Bachelor's level students of Electronics and Computer Engineering along with Electrical Engineering organize Locus - a national level technology festival annually.

Career Prospects 

Computer engineers are in high demand in different industries including software, hardware, and electronics. Computer engineer can work in any of the positions:

 Systems Analyst
 Software Engineer
 System Administrator
 Network Administrator/Manager
 Database Administrator/Manager
 Web Developer/Administrator/Manager
 Telecommunication Engineer
 Computer & Information System Manager
 Embedded System Designer
 Graphics Hardware Engineer
 Secure Firmware Developer
 RTL Designer
 SoC Architect
 Artificial Intelligence and Machine Learning

Bachelor of Mechanical Engineering (BME) (48 Seats) 
Mechanical engineering, the broadest of all Engineering disciplines deals with design and production of tools, machines and all other mechanical equipment to be used in industries. The industry offers a wide choice of options extending across many interdisciplinary interdependent specialties, including aerospace engineering.

Mechanical engineering is concerned with all types of machinery in industries and all aspects of their mechanism and functioning; the design, development, construction, production, installation, operation and maintenance; such as large steam and gas turbines, components of thermal power stations, internal combustion engines, jet engines, machine tools, air conditioning and heating machines, refrigerators etc. to name a few. They not only design and create new products, but also develop materials for them and ways of making them. Every year the ROBOT competition is organized by the institution in which the Mechanical department plays a role in designing the robot.

In 2014, the department took the initiatives to introduce aerospace engineering degree in Nepal, alongside its Bachelors in Mechanical Engineering program. The courses were initially designed in collaboration with aviation and aeronautical experts in Nepal,  and a faculty member for aeronautical engineering was added to the department in April 2014. Since then, the department established aerospace laboratories, including air-frame, avionics and gas-turbine engine components, a subsonic wind-tunnel facility, and a high-performance computing workstation facility. Aeronautical/aerospace engineering was taught as a specialization course in fourth year (AeroStream), where the students were allowed to choose their respective streams. Since 2014, around 20 students enrolled in AeroStream each year at Pulchowk, with provisions for additional students enrolling at IOE Thapathali and IOE Dharan. Additionally, with the start of the M.Sc. in Mechanical Systems Design and Engineering at the department in February 2017, and the addition of three new faculty members for aerospace engineering during late 2017 and early 2018, the department took the necessary steps to introduce Bachelors of Aerospace Engineering in 2018.

Career Prospects 
Mechanical engineers use engineering principles to provide efficient solutions to the development of processes and products, ranging from small component designs to extremely large plant, machinery or vehicles. They can work on all stages of a product, from research and development to design and manufacture, through to installation and final commissioning.

Most industries rely on mechanical systems and mechanical engineering is thought to be one of the most diverse of all engineering disciplines, with employment opportunities available in a wide range of sectors, such as the manufacturing, power, construction and medical industries.

Mechanical engineers can also be involved in the management of people and resources, as well as the development and use of new materials and technologies.

Bachelor of Aerospace Engineering (BAE) (48 Seats) 
Carrying-on from the developments under the aeronautical/aerospace unit at the Department of Mechanical Engineering, Pulchowk Campus started the bachelor's degree program in aerospace engineering in 2018. With the intakes starting in August of that year, the program is run under the Department of Mechanical Engineering. The program covers all the essential as well as optional courses of the aeronautical streams, with further elective courses options for space engineering- including propulsion systems, navigation and communication systems, aerothermodynamics, etc. Following the current conventions in the field, the program was named 'Aerospace Engineering', instead of Aeronautical Engineering.

The department has already established aerospace laboratories, including air-frame, avionics and gas-turbine engine components laboratory, a subsonic wind-tunnel facility, and a high-performance computing workstation facility. In addition, with now an academic unit for aerospace engineering with four academics, the department is establishing new laboratories for teaching and research over the next several years.

Career Prospects 
Since aerospace engineering is generally the driver of state-of-art of the engineering and applied sciences, this field can strongly complement other fields of science and engineering. Many of the advanced technological fields such as computational and experimental fluid dynamics, composite and advanced material science and manufacturing, fatigue and fracture mechanics, computer-aided engineering designs, structural analysis using finite element methods, structural health monitoring, high-performance computing, numerical methods in science and engineering, communication and navigation systems, etc. have been largely a product of the developments in aerospace industry and research.

For a country like Nepal with difficult terrains for land-based transportation and access, aviation has proven to be a reliable and increasingly affordable form of the transportation system. Its importance has been further highlighted by the rapid growth in the aviation sector in the country in the recent years. However, due to the weak infrastructure, inadequate aerodrome standards, underdeveloped industrial practices and at times heedless regulatory oversight in the country, the aviation industry has so far struggled to meet the service and safety standards as anticipated by the current necessities, which has also greatly hindered its progress. This program intends to boost the domestic capabilities in the aviation and aerospace engineering sector with the generation of the capable manpower.

In Nepal, the student can choose to work in the rapidly growing aviation industry- in the private as well as public organizations. In addition, the program will provide the essential skill sets to be competitive for academic, engineering as well as research position in industries and universities outside Nepal in the fields of aviation and aerospace sciences and technology.

Bachelor of Electronics, Communication and Information Engineering (BEI) (48 Seats) 
The Electronics, Communication and Information Engineering program—previously known as Electronics and Communication Engineering—is a four-year, eight-semester program. The revised course was started in 2018 in all the campuses under the IOE.

Electronics, Communication and Information Engineers are responsible to apply techniques and skills to analyze and design complex electronics and communication systems. Electronics is at the heart of the new industrial revolution. Recent innovations in the field of electronics and communication have led to rapid growth in areas such as mobile communications, high-quality audio, digital cameras, multimedia, and the Internet.

The department provides practical education and is equipped with electronic measuring and testing equipment, and a network of high-speed computers. The Department of Electronics and Computer Engineering offers a four-year undergraduate program in Electronics Engineering and Computer Engineering. It also offers Master's degree course in Information and Communication Engineering as well as Computer Systems and Knowledge Engineering. The students of Electronics and Computer Engineering department along with the students of Electrical Engineering department organize LOCUS annually which is a national level technology festival.

Career Prospects 
Electronics, Communication and Information engineers make technical contributions to design, development, and manufacturing or assembly of electronics and communication devices. Qualified engineers have further opportunities in the universities and research centers or option for higher education. These engineers can work in any of the areas suggested for:

 Consumer electronics manufacturing companies
Telecommunication companies
Robotics and Automation sector
Embedded systems
Internet service providing companies
Network Administration and Information Security
Artificial Intelligence and Machine Learning
Web and Software development and designing
 Hospitals and Medicinal institutions
 Civil Aviation and Airlines
 Industries
 Hydropower

Bachelor of Electrical Engineering (BEL) (96 Seats) 
Electrical Engineering courses could only be taken at Pulchowk Campus until recently, when the private colleges have started providing the same. The department has a Power and Electrical machines lab. Most of the electrical engineering graduates are working in the Nepal Electricity Authority, the governmental organization involved in power generation, transmission and distribution. The department offers an MS in Power Systems. Graduates pursuing their MS and PhD programs have been involved in research in universities around the world.

Career Prospects 
Some electrical engineers focus in the study of electronic devices and circuits that are the basic building blocks of complex electronic systems. Others study power and the generation, transmission, and utilization of electrical energy. A large group of electrical engineers studies the application of these complex systems to other areas, including medicine, biology, geology, and ecology. Still another controls, telecommunications, wireless communications, and signal processing.

Bachelor of Chemical Engineering (BCH) (48 Seats) 
Bachelor of Chemical Engineering is the recent addition to the courses by IOE. It is a four and a half years, nine-semester program which aims at producing modern and skilled chemical engineers in the country.

Bachelor in Architecture (B.Arch) (48 Seats) 
Architecture is the blend of art and Science in designing Physical structures that shape the environment in which we live, using creativity and practical understanding of structures and materials do develop concept, plans, and specifications and detailed drawing of buildings. Architects may also be involved in project feasibility studies, heritage study, urban planning, interior design and landscape design.  If you are interested in Creating things, expressing them visually and Art and designs you can succeed and enjoy in this career.

Career Options 
As an architect you may choose to go into general practice or specialize in commercial, historical building conservation, housing renovation, industrial or institutional developments anywhere in the world.

Undergraduate programs enrollment

Postgraduate programs 
 Master of Science (M.Sc) in Urban Planning
 Master of Science (M.Sc) in Information & Communication Engineering
 Master of Science (M.Sc) in Structural Engineering
 Master of Science (M.Sc) in Power System Engineering
 Master of Science (M.Sc) in Renewable Energy Engineering
 Master of Science (M.Sc) in Water Resources Engineering
 Master of Science (M.Sc) in Geo-Technical Engineering
 Master of Science (M.Sc) in Transportation Engineering
 Master of Science (M.Sc) in Disaster Risk Management
 Master of Science (M.Sc) in Computer System and Knowledge Engineering
 Master of Science (M.Sc) in Energy System Planning and Management
 Master of Science (M.Sc) in Environmental Engineering
 Master of Science (M.Sc) in Construction Management
 Master of Science (M.Sc) in Technology and Innovation Management
 Master of Science (M.Sc) in Climate change and Development
 Master of Science (M.Sc) in Material Science
 Master of Science (M.Sc) in Mechanical Engineering (Mechanical Systems Design and Engineering)
 Master of Science (M.Sc) in Hydropower Engineering

College facilities 
The college premises spreading on 480 ropanis, consists of several buildings for classes and laboratories of engineering/architecture faculties. It is also the biggest engineering college in the country with well-equipped labs and facilities.

Pulchowk Campus Library is one of the largest libraries of Nepal. The CIT center provides free internet throughout the campus for students and staffs. The college has hostels for boys and girls selected on merit basis. There is a cricket ground (also used by CAN for domestic and international tournaments), a football ground and a basketball court. The Center for Energy Studies (CES) conducts research in energy sources and other similar projects. The Robotics Club is noteworthy. Students of Bachelor's level from different departments of the campus, specifically from Electronics and Computer, and Mechanical Engineering departments together make robots to participate in ABU Robocon every year. Besides the international competition the Robotics Club also engages in training the students of the campus that have an interest in robotics field.

Notable alumni
 Shrinkhala Khatiwada- Miss Nepal 2018 graduated in 2017 B.Arch course.
 Kulman Ghising- Managing  Director of Nepal Electricity Authority.
C. K. Raut- Founder of Janamat Party.

See also 

 Institute of Engineering homepage
 Department of Mechanical Engineering homepage
 Thapathali Campus, IOE
 Pashchimanchal Campus, IOE
 Purwanchal Campus, IOE
 Solar Radiation and Aerosol in Himalaya Region (SAHR)
 Tribhuvan University
 Kathmandu University
 Pokhara University
 Mid-western University

References 

Engineering universities and colleges in Nepal
Tribhuvan University
1972 establishments in Nepal